Canada Dock can refer to a number of places:

 Canada Dock, dock on the River Mersey and part of the Port of Liverpool, England.
 Canada Dock Branch, a railway line in Liverpool, England
 Canada Dock railway station, the passenger terminus of the Canada Dock Branch, situated near Canada Dock, Liverpool, England
 Canada Dock railway station (Liverpool Overhead Railway) (1893–1956), Liverpool, England
 Canada Dock, now known as Canada Water, former dock of the Surrey Commercial Docks of the Port of London, England